The Derby Corse is a rivalry in French football between AC Ajaccio and SC Bastia, the two biggest clubs on the island of Corsica. The rivalry is intensified by the existing geographical rivalry of the island. Ajaccio is the capital of the island and largest city, as well as capital of the southern Corse-du-Sud department, while Bastia is the second city of the island and capital of the northern Haute-Corse department.

After a two-year absence the league fixtures  returned to the calendar in the 2012–13 Ligue 1 season. After crowd trouble during 2012–13 season the fixtures of the following season were to be played behind closed doors at neutral venues. The first league fixture (Ajaccio at home) was played in Istres, Bastia played their punishment in Martigues in a Coupe de la Ligue fixture. It was agreed that the Bastia league fixture would be played at the usual Armand-Cesari but that Ajaccio fans would not be admitted. The game had extra significance as Ajaccio required a win to avoid relegation. Despite Ajaccio taking the lead in the 4th minute Bastia drew level on 32 minutes before scoring a last minute winner to relegate ACA.

Head to head

All-time results

League

Cup

References

External links
Official AC Ajaccio 
Official SC Bastia website 
Official LFP website

French football derbies
AC Ajaccio
SC Bastia
Football in Corsica
Recurring sporting events established in 1965
1965 establishments in France